Disonycha triangularis, the three-spotted flea beetle, is a species of flea beetle in the family Chrysomelidae. It is found in North America.

Subspecies
These two subspecies belong to the species Disonycha triangularis:
 Disonycha triangularis montanensis Blake
 Disonycha triangularis triangularis

References

Further reading

 
 

Alticini
Articles created by Qbugbot
Beetles described in 1824